The 1982 NCAA Division II football season, part of college football in the United States organized by the National Collegiate Athletic Association at the Division II level, began in August 1982, and concluded with the NCAA Division II Football Championship on December 11, 1982, at McAllen Veterans Memorial Stadium in McAllen, Texas. During the game's five-year stretch in McAllen, the "City of Palms", it was referred to as the Palm Bowl.

Southwest Texas State defeated UC Davis in the championship game, 34–9, to win their second overall and second consecutive Division II national title.

Conference changes and new programs
 One team upgraded from Division II to Division I-AA prior to the season.
 The Far Western Football Conference changed its name to the Northern California Athletic Conference. Its membership remained the same.
 The Lone Star Conference became a full Division II member conference.
 The Western Football Conference was formed by five football-playing schools in California.

Conference standings

Conference summaries

Postseason

The 1982 NCAA Division II Football Championship playoffs were the 10th single-elimination tournament to determine the national champion of men's NCAA Division II college football. The championship game was held at McAllen Veterans Memorial Stadium in McAllen, Texas, for the second time.

Playoff bracket

See also
1982 NAIA Division I football season
1982 NAIA Division II football season

References